Gurgi is a fictional character in The Chronicles of Prydain series of fantasy novels.

Gurgi may also refer to:
 Gwrgi, brother of Peredur, a figure of medieval British legend
 Gurgi, a local name for the fern Pteridium esculentum

See also 
 Gurgi Mosque, in Tripoli, Libya
 Gurgy, a commune in France
 Gwrgi (disambiguation)
 Gorgi (disambiguation)